Pima albocostalialis is a species of snout moth. It is found in western North America, including California, Colorado, Utah, Alberta and British Columbia.

References

Moths described in 1886
Phycitini
Pima (moth)